Jerzy Janowicz was the defending champion, but he did not participate that year.

Andreas Haider-Maurer won the title, defeating Damir Džumhur in the final, 4–6, 6–1, 7–5.

Seeds

Draw

Finals

Top half

Bottom half

References

External links
 Main Draw
 Qualifying Draw

Poznan Open - Singles
2013 Singles